Rhopalaea crassa, sometimes known as the blue ascidian, is a species of tunicate belonging to the family Diazonidae.

Description
Rhopalaea crassa can reach a length of about 5 cm.

Distribution
This species can be found in the Indo-West Pacific.

References 

Enterogona
Fauna of the Indian Ocean
Fauna of the Pacific Ocean
Animals described in 1880
Taxa named by William Abbott Herdman